The Yonkers City Council is the legislative branch of the city of Yonkers, New York. and uses a strong Mayor-Council government. The city elects six councilmen, each serving four year terms and an at-large member which is called the City Council president, all serving for four years at a time and subject to two-term limits. Regular meetings are held every Tuesday of the month, with extra meetings to be held other days, if planned. The city is largest in Westchester County, New York and fourth largest in the state.

City Council

Committees 

 Rules
 Budget
 Environmental Policy and Protection
 Real Estate
 Education
 Intergovernmental Affairs
 Municipal Operations and Public Safety
 Community Service
 Legislation and Codes

References

External links 
 Yonkers City Council Website
 Yonkers Government Website
 Committee members
 

New York (state) city councils
Yonkers, New York